Ancachita (possibly from Quechua anka eagle, chita young domesticated sheep / a little animal which follows its owner) is a mountain in the Andes of Peru, about  high. It is situated in the Arequipa Region, Caylloma Province, on the border of the districts Callalli and Chivay, east of Chivay. Ancachita lies north of the higher mountains Huarancante and Jello Jello.

References 

Mountains of Peru
Mountains of Arequipa Region